This is a list of members of the Western Australian Legislative Council from 22 May 1924 to 21 May 1926. The chamber had 30 seats made up of ten provinces each electing three members, on a system of rotation whereby one-third of the members would retire at each biennial election. In the previous term, the Country Party split into rival Ministerial (MCP) and Executive (ECP) factions. The Executive faction, loyal to the Primary Producers' Association, prevailed and by 1925 the Ministerial faction had merged with the remnants of the National Labor Party into the Nationalist Party.

Notes
 On 22 June 1925, South-East Country MLC James Greig died. Country candidate William Glasheen won the resulting by-election on 18 July 1925.

Sources
 
 
 

Members of Western Australian parliaments by term